Jean-François Bergeron (born July 26, 1973) is a Canadian former professional boxer. As an amateur, he represented his native country at the 1996 Summer Olympics in Atlanta, Georgia.

Amateur career
He won the Canadian championship five time and won gold in 4 international championships, beating the likes of Paolo Vidoz and Michael Sprott.

Southpaw Bergeron won the silver medal at the 1995 Pan American Games. He competed in Atlanta at the Olympics but was knocked out by Attila Levin.

Bergeron wrapped up his amateur career with a record of 70 wins, 15 defeats.

Professional career
Bergeron fought his first pro bout on April 3, 1998, at age 24. In 2001 he beat undefeated American amateur champ Willie Palms. In 2003 he beat Darroll Wilson (who holds a knockout win over Shannon Briggs). Bergeron was injured at the time and fought only with his right arm from the second round, but still managed to win the fight by a unanimous decision. In 2006 he bested Steve Panell (who had knocked down Wladimir Klitschko when they fought).

Fight against Valuev
Bergeron faced former WBA heavyweight champion Nikolai Valuev on Sept 29th 2007 in Germany. He lost by unanimous decision.

After his fight with Valuev he fought Dominick Guinn losing by second-round knockout on October 24, 2008.

Professional boxing record

|-
|align="center" colspan=8|27 Wins (19 knockouts, 8 decisions), 2 Losses (1 knockout, 1 decision) 
|-
| align="center" style="border-style: none none solid solid; background: #e3e3e3"|Result
| align="center" style="border-style: none none solid solid; background: #e3e3e3"|Record
| align="center" style="border-style: none none solid solid; background: #e3e3e3"|Opponent
| align="center" style="border-style: none none solid solid; background: #e3e3e3"|Type
| align="center" style="border-style: none none solid solid; background: #e3e3e3"|Round
| align="center" style="border-style: none none solid solid; background: #e3e3e3"|Date
| align="center" style="border-style: none none solid solid; background: #e3e3e3"|Location
| align="center" style="border-style: none none solid solid; background: #e3e3e3"|Notes
|-align=center
|Loss
|
|align=left| Dominick Guinn
|KO
|2
|24/10/2008
|align=left| Montreal, Quebec, Canada
|align=left|
|-
|Loss
|
|align=left| Nikolay Valuev
|UD
|12
|29/09/2007
|align=left| Oldenburg, Germany
|align=left|
|-
|Win
|
|align=left| Robert Hawkins
|UD
|10
|15/06/2007
|align=left| Montreal, Quebec, Canada
|align=left|
|-
|Win
|
|align=left| Chad Van Sickle
|TKO
|4
|26/01/2007
|align=left| Montreal, Quebec, Canada
|align=left|
|-
|Win
|
|align=left| Edegar Da Silva
|KO
|5
|15/09/2006
|align=left| Montreal, Quebec, Canada
|align=left|
|-
|Win
|
|align=left| Andy Sample
|TKO
|1
|02/06/2006
|align=left| Saint-Jérôme, Quebec, Canada
|align=left|
|-
|Win
|
|align=left| Steve Pannell
|KO
|3
|24/03/2006
|align=left| Montreal, Quebec, Canada
|align=left|
|-
|Win
|
|align=left| Marcus McGee
|UD
|8
|16/09/2005
|align=left| Montreal, Quebec, Canada
|align=left|
|-
|Win
|
|align=left| Jimmy Joseph
|TKO
|4
|18/03/2005
|align=left| Montreal, Quebec, Canada
|align=left|
|-
|Win
|
|align=left| Reynaldo Minus
|UD
|6
|03/12/2004
|align=left| Montreal, Quebec, Canada
|align=left|
|-
|Win
|
|align=left| Rogerio Lobo
|KO
|2
|20/03/2004
|align=left| Montreal, Quebec, Canada
|align=left|
|-
|Win
|
|align=left| Darroll Wilson
|UD
|10
|07/03/2003
|align=left| Niagara Falls, Ontario, Canada
|align=left|
|-
|Win
|
|align=left| Brian Nix
|TKO
|5
|17/11/2002
|align=left| Grand Forks, North Dakota, U.S.
|align=left|
|-
|Win
|
|align=left| Mario Cawley
|KO
|4
|06/09/2002
|align=left| Montreal, Quebec, Canada
|align=left|
|-
|Win
|
|align=left| Derrick Brown
|RTD
|7
|31/05/2002
|align=left| Bucharest, Romania
|align=left|
|-
|Win
|
|align=left| Marcellus Brown
|TKO
|3
|21/04/2002
|align=left| Laughlin, Nevada, U.S.
|align=left|
|-
|Win
|
|align=left| Jason Nicholson
|UD
|6
|18/01/2002
|align=left| Las Vegas, Nevada, U.S.
|align=left|
|-
|Win
|
|align=left| Curt Paige
|TKO
|2
|30/11/2001
|align=left| Montreal, Quebec, Canada
|align=left|
|-
|Win
|
|align=left| Willie Palms
|UD
|6
|28/09/2001
|align=left| Las Vegas, Nevada, U.S.
|align=left|
|-
|Win
|
|align=left| Art Card
|TKO
|2
|10/07/2001
|align=left| Montreal, Quebec, Canada
|align=left|
|-
|Win
|
|align=left| Sean Williams
|TKO
|3
|02/03/2001
|align=left| Montreal, Quebec, Canada
|align=left|
|-
|Win
|
|align=left| Ben Perlini
|KO
|2
|15/12/2000
|align=left| Montreal, Quebec, Canada
|align=left|
|-
|Win
|
|align=left| Muhammad Raheem
|UD
|4
|16/06/2000
|align=left| Montreal, Quebec, Canada
|align=left|
|-
|Win
|
|align=left| Marcelo Aravena
|UD
|6
|06/05/2000
|align=left| Maniwaki, Quebec, Canada
|align=left|
|-
|Win
|
|align=left| Mark Johnson
|TKO
|4
|29/06/1999
|align=left| Montreal, Quebec, Canada
|align=left|
|-
|Win
|
|align=left| Tracy Wilson
|KO
|2
|06/11/1998
|align=left| Montreal, Quebec, Canada
|align=left|
|-
|Win
|
|align=left| Marcelo Aravena
|TKO
|3
|05/05/1998
|align=left| Montreal, Quebec, Canada
|align=left|
|-
|Win
|
|align=left| Mark Johnson
|KO
|2
|24/04/1998
|align=left| Sherbrooke, Quebec, Canada
|align=left|
|-
|Win
|
|align=left| Donald Harris
|TKO
|2
|03/04/1998
|align=left| Montreal, Quebec, Canada
|align=left|
|}

Outside the ring
Bergeron is often asked to take on the analyst role in boxing matches, appearing on local Québec channel TVA and Québec radio stations. He offered his expertise on radio on Lucian Bute's championship fight at the Bell Centre in Montréal on October 19, 2007. He also served as a sparring partner to Vitali Klitchko in preparation for his fight against Corrie Sanders for the WBC world heavyweight championship in April 2004.

He has also successfully completed his firefighter training and is currently working as a firefighter at the St-Jérôme fire station.

External links
 
 Canadian Olympic Committee
 sports-reference

1973 births
Boxers at the 1996 Summer Olympics
Heavyweight boxers
Living people
Olympic boxers of Canada
People from Saint-Jérôme
Sportspeople from Quebec
Boxers at the 1995 Pan American Games
Canadian male boxers
Pan American Games silver medalists for Canada
Pan American Games medalists in boxing
Medalists at the 1995 Pan American Games